is a railway station in the city of Sōma, Fukushima, Japan, operated by East Japan Railway Company (JR East).

Lines
However, due to damage to the line caused by the 2011 Tōhoku earthquake and tsunami, trains from Nittaki were only able to travel as far as Namie Station. Operations were restored to Haranomachi Station on 21 December 2011, and full services on the line were resumed on 14 March 2020.

Station layout
The station has a single side platform and an island platform connected to the station building by a footbridge. However, at present platform 3 is not in use. The station is unattended.

Platforms

History
Nittaki Station opened on 15 August 1922. The station was absorbed into the JR East network upon the privatization of the Japanese National Railways (JNR) on April 1, 1987.

Surrounding area
 Sōma Roadside Station
 Niitaki Post Office
 Sōma Shrine

See also
 List of railway stations in Japan

External links

  

Railway stations in Fukushima Prefecture
Jōban Line
Railway stations in Japan opened in 1922
Sōma, Fukushima
Stations of East Japan Railway Company